Since the mid-1980s, there have been numerous officially-licensed video game adaptations of the board game Scrabble.

1988 Leisure Genius version

In 1988, Dragon gave Leisure Genius' Macintosh version (promoted as The Computer Edition of Scrabble).

2000 version
In the United States, the PC version of Scrabble sold 260,000 copies and earned $2.5 million by August 2006, after its release in July 2000. It was the country's 78th best-selling computer game between January 2000 and August 2006. Combined sales of all Scrabble computer games released between January 2000 and August 2006 had reached 910,000 in the United States by the latter date.

References

External links

Scrabble software
1984 video games
Acorn Archimedes games
Amiga games
Apple II games
Atari ST games
BBC Micro and Acorn Electron games
BlackBerry games
DOS games
Game.com games
Game Boy Advance games
Game Boy Color games
IOS games
Classic Mac OS games
Nintendo DS games
PlayStation (console) games
PlayStation 4 games
PlayStation Portable games
Video games based on board games
Video games developed in the United Kingdom
Windows Mobile games
Xbox One games